Antin is a commune in the Hautes-Pyrénées department in southwestern France. It was once a duchy owned by the House of Pardaillan de Gondrin, the family which Madame de Montespan married into.

The former Barony then Marquisate, was elevated to a duchy by Louis XIV (former lover of Mme de Montespan) in 1711 for Louis Antoine de Pardaillan de Gondrin and was passed down his family till its extinction in 1757 at the death of Louis Antoine's great grandson Louis de Pardaillan de Gondrin (1727–1757) who died in Breme during the Seven Years' War.

Population

See also
Communes of the Hautes-Pyrénées department
Dukes of Antin

References

Communes of Hautes-Pyrénées